This is a list of bridges in the Philippines. This list includes notable viaducts or landbridges built over land mass, on coastal areas, riverbanks and on diversion roads.

List

Under construction and proposed bridges
Mindoro–Batangas Super Bridge
Panguil Bay Bridge
Iloilo–Guimaras–Negros–Cebu Link Bridge
Roma Point Bridge
Bataan–Cavite Interlink Bridge
Davao–Samal Bridge

See also
 List of crossings of the Pasig River
 List of crossings of the Marikina River

References

External links
 Department of Public Works and Highways

Bridges in the Philippines
Philippines
Bridges